The SR N15X class or Remembrance class were a design of British 4-6-0 steam locomotives converted in 1934 by Richard Maunsell of the Southern Railway from the large LB&SCR L class 4-6-4 tank locomotives that had become redundant on the London–Brighton line following electrification. It was hoped that further service could be obtained from these locomotives on the Southern's Western Section, sharing the duties of the N15 class locomotives. The locomotives were named after famous Victorian engineers except for Remembrance, which was the LBSCR's memorial locomotive for staff members who died in the First World War.

In their new form the locomotives were similar in outline to the N15 class, though suffered from the expectation amongst crews that they were an improved version of this type. Despite this, their ability to accelerate well was put to good use on cross-country trains between main lines. The class saw service into nationalisation in 1948. All had been withdrawn by 1957, with none preserved.

Background 

With the impending electrification of the Southern Railway's Central Section (the former LB&SCR lines), the question arose as to what to do with the relatively new and powerful LB&SCR designs.  Maunsell looked at the possibility of converting the LB&SCR “Remembrance” or L Class 4-6-4 tanks built by L. B. Billinton between 1914 and 1922.  These Baltics had proved to be capable machines on the Brighton line, although their relatively low boiler pressure, the excessive difference between "first valve" and "second valve" on the regulator, and more particularly their small piston valves in relation to their large cylinders were a significant limitation, precluding their use on any other part of the Southern system. The limited coal and water capacity also limited their range, though adequate for the short runs on the Brighton line. The decision was taken to rebuild them into more conventional 4-6-0 tender locomotives.

Conversion

All seven of the Billinton L Class locomotives entered Eastleigh works in 1934 for rebuilding, each leaving the works the same year. Conversion into the 4-6-0 tender type, entailed removing the trailing bogie, water tanks, and bunker, shortening the mainframes  and fitting new cabs; these were of the side-window variety already used on the Lord Nelson class.

The class received  bogie tenders from Robert Urie's S15 class and Southern-type smoke deflectors on either side of the smokebox. The result was classified N15X, the suffix corresponding to the old LBSCR designation for a rebuilt/modified locomotive. The conversion process created a locomotive that was similar in appearance to the N15 "King Arthur" class as modified by Maunsell in the 1920s.

Naming the locomotives

Two of the locomotives retained their original names: number 2333 Remembrance and 2329 Stephenson, whilst the other members of the L class, were newly new named after famous railway engineers.  The new locomotive names were suggested by Maunsell's assistant, Harry Holcroft, and were distributed as thus:

2327 Trevithick,  
2328 Hackworth, 
2329 Stephenson, 
2330 Cudworth, 
2331 Beattie, 
2332 Stroudley, 
2333 Remembrance

2333 Remembrance retained its name as it had been the LBSCR's designated memorial to employees lost in the First World War. However the original LBSCR nameplates were straight for water tank mounting, necessitating new rounded plates to fit over the central wheel splashers (see colour plate in infobox above).

Operational details 

The rebuilding caused a certain amount of controversy among footplate crews, with some maintaining that one could not make so many changes and have a reliable locomotive at the end of the process. The class suffered on the South Western section from the expectation that they were an improved version of the N15 "King Arthur" class. Once this misconception was overcome, the class came into their own on the Basingstoke services, where their ability to accelerate well was put to good use.  However, the rebuilds gained a reputation for rough riding and relatively poor efficiency when compared to the N15s, and were dissimilar in performance to the original L class locomotives, making them unpopular with crews.  Because of this, the class was used on secondary duties, cross-country and inter-regional trains around Basingstoke rather than the heavy London to Exeter expresses for which they were intended. 

Several of the class were loaned to the Great Western Railway between 1942 and 1944 to assist in bolstering freight power, of which there was an acute shortage on that railway during the Second World War. The class saw use after nationalisation in 1948, but with increasing numbers of Bulleid Pacifics able to take over their duties the Remembrance class began to be withdrawn from service during the mid-1950s. Hackworth was the first to be withdrawn, in 1955, and finally Beattie in 1957. The early withdrawal of the class ensured that none were preserved.

Accidents and incidents
In 1940, No. 2328 Hackworth was at the Nine Elms shed when it and LSWR T14 No. 458 and four LSWR Class N15 express engines which included 751 Etarre, No. 755 The Red Knight, No. 775 Sir Agravaine, and No. 776 Sir Galagars suffered air raid damage. The T14 engine was scrapped while the other engines were eventually repaired.
On 23 December 1955, locomotive No. 32327 Trevithick was hauling a passenger train that ran into the rear of another at Woking, Surrey. The locomotive was deemed beyond economic repair and was scrapped at Eastleigh Works, Hampshire.

Livery and numbering

Southern

Under Southern ownership, the "Remembrances" were originally painted in Maunsell's Olive Green livery as seen above, with "Southern" and the locomotive's number on the tender tank.  Wartime service under the Southern saw the locomotives painted in black livery with "Sunshine Yellow" lettering.  Numbers allocated to the locomotives were 2327 to 2333.  After the war, the locomotives were turned out in Bulleid's Southern Railway Malachite Green livery with "Sunshine Yellow" lettering.

British Railways

After nationalisation in 1948, the locomotives' initial livery was a slightly modified Southern Malachite Green livery, where "British Railways" replaced "Southern" in "Sunshine Yellow" lettering on the tender sides. From 1949, the class was turned out in British Railways mixed-traffic black livery with red and cream lining.  The British Railways crest was placed on the tender water tank sides.  Numbering was in the 32xxx series, as numbers 32327 to 32333.

References

Notes

Bibliography

Banks, Chris: BR Locomotives 1955 (Oxford Publishing Company: Oxford, 2001), 
Bradley, D.L., Locomotives of the London, Brighton and South Coast Railway Vol 3
Clarke, Jeremy: 'The Locomotives of R. E. L. Maunsell' (Steam World: 254, August 2008)

Holcroft, Harry: Locomotive Panorama vol 1
Haresnape, Brian: Maunsell Locomotives – a pictorial history (Ian Allan Ltd, 1977), 
Ian Allan ABC of British Railways Locomotives, 1954-55 edition
Scott-Morgan, John: Maunsell Locomotives (Ian Allan Publishing: Hinckley, 2002), 
Russell, J. H.: A Pictorial Record of Southern Locomotives (Oxford Publishing Company: Oxford)
Swift, Peter: Maunsell 4-6-0 King Arthur Class (Ian Allan Publishing: Hinckley, 2006) (Locomotives in Detail series volume 4) (Hinckley: Ian Allan Publishing, 2006),

External links 
 SEMG gallery

N15X
4-6-0 locomotives
Railway locomotives introduced in 1934
Scrapped locomotives
Standard gauge steam locomotives of Great Britain